Orthonevra nitida , the Wavy Mucksucker, is a fairly common species of syrphid fly. It has been observed in Eastern and Central North America. Hoverflies get their names from the ability to remain nearly motionless while in flight. The adults are also known as flower flies for they are commonly found around and on flowers from which they get both energy-giving nectar and protein rich pollen. Larvae for this genus are of the rat-tailed type. O. nitida larvae have not been described.

References

External links

 

Eristalinae
Articles created by Qbugbot
Insects described in 1830
Taxa named by Christian Rudolph Wilhelm Wiedemann